Roland Hartwig (born 22 September 1954) is a German politician for the populist Alternative for Germany (AfD) and since 2017 member of the Bundestag.

Life and achievements
Hartwig was born 1954 in Berlin and studied jurisprudence at the University of Freiburg and became a Doctor of Law in 1984. 

Hartwig was 'Chefsyndikus' (chief syndic) of the law department of the world leading chemical concern (business) Bayer from 1999 to 2016 

Hartwig entered the newly founded AfD in 2013 and is since the 2017 German federal election member of the Bundestag.

References

Living people
1954 births
Politicians from Berlin
20th-century German lawyers
University of Freiburg alumni
Bayer people
Members of the Bundestag for North Rhine-Westphalia
Members of the Bundestag 2017–2021
Members of the Bundestag for the Alternative for Germany